Pomovirus is a genus of viruses, in the family Virgaviridae. Plants and  dicotyledons serve as natural hosts. There are five species in this genus. Diseases associated with this genus include: dwarfing of shoots (mop-top) and potato spraing disease. The name of the genus is derived from Potato mop-top virus, Potato mop-top virus, giving rise to Pomovirus.

Taxonomy
The following five species are assigned to the genus:
 Beet soil-borne virus
 Beet virus Q
 Broad bean necrosis virus
 Colombian potato soil-borne virus
 Potato mop-top virus

Structure
Viruses in the genus Pomovirus are non-enveloped, with rod-shaped geometries, and helical symmetry. The diameter is around 21 nm, with a length of 245 nm. Genomes are linear and segmented. The three segments are about 6, 3.5, and 3kb in length.

Life cycle
Viral replication is cytoplasmic. Entry into the host cell is achieved by penetration into the host cell. Replication follows the positive stranded RNA virus replication model. Positive stranded RNA virus transcription is the method of transcription. Translation takes place by suppression of termination. The virus exits the host cell by tripartite non-tubule guided viral movement. Plants and  dicotyledons serve as the natural host. The virus is transmitted via a vector (fungus). Transmission routes are vector.

References

External links
 ICTV 10th Report Virgaviridae
 Viralzone: Pomovirus
 ICTV

Virgaviridae
Viral plant pathogens and diseases
Virus genera